Triteleia lilacina, the foothill triteleia, is a monocot flowering plant in the genus Triteleia.

It is endemic to California, where it is limited to the Central Valley and adjacent Sierra Nevada foothills. It occurs on dry hillsides, especially with volcanic soils.

Description
Triteleia lilacina is a perennial wildflower growing from a corm. There are two or three basal leaves measuring up to 40 centimeters long by 2 wide.

The inflorescence arises on an erect stem up to 60 centimeters tall. It is an umbel-like cluster of several flowers each borne on a pedicel up to 5 centimeters long. The white flower is somewhat bowl-shaped with shiny, glasslike vesicles in the center. The six stamens have purplish anthers.

References

External links
Jepson Manual Treatment
Flora of North America
Photo gallery

lilacina
Endemic flora of California
Flora of the Sierra Nevada (United States)
Natural history of the California chaparral and woodlands
Natural history of the Central Valley (California)
Flora without expected TNC conservation status